The Rentina Gorge or Macedonian Tempe (Greek: Μακεδονικά Τέμπη) is a gorge in Rentina, Thessaloniki, Macedonia, Greece, named after Tempe (mod. pronunciation: "Tembi"), the long strip of gorges, hills and rivers in Thessaly. 

The Rentina Gorge, located between Mount Cholomon and the Kerdylia mountains, lies just outside the major city of Thessaloniki and is a popular tourist spot during autumn, when the leaves change colour, and summer, when many people picnic there.

Canyons and gorges of Greece
Macedonia (Greece)
Landforms of Thessaloniki (regional unit)
Landforms of Central Macedonia